Alyce Rogers is an American mezzo-soprano and alto opera singer. She began her career as an actor on the East Coast, but later found her passion in opera and light opera. After moving to Portland, Oregon, she appeared with the Oregon Symphony, the Israel Philharmonic Orchestra, and the Seattle Symphony Orchestra, among others. Rogers is well known for her interpretations of the mezzo and contralto riles in the operas of Gilbert and Sullivan, and Menotti.

References

Musicians from Portland, Oregon
American opera singers
Year of birth missing (living people)
Living people
Place of birth missing (living people)
Singers from Oregon
Classical musicians from Oregon